The 2011 Victoria Cup was scheduled to take place in June and July 2011; it will be the second Victoria Cup with the national teams from Zimbabwe, Kenya and Uganda competing in a round robin tournament, with both home and away fixtures.  Kenya are the reigning champions after winning all 4 of their matches in 2010.

Schedule

Click on the date in the first column to see more details on that match.

2011 Final Table of Standings

2011 points scorers

Match 1
Tangai Nemadire put the Sables 5-0 up eight minutes into the game.  Justin Kimono, top try scorer at the recently concluded Bamburi Rugby Super Series restored parity for the home side on thirty minutes.  The diminutive Kimono, making his national team debut scored again two minutes later.  Tichafara Makwanya's thirty fifth-minute penalty narrowed the deficit to 10-8 just before half-time. Prop forward Denford Mutamangira scored a try on forty eight minutes with Makwanya's conversion putting Zimbabwe 15-10 ahead. Gardner Nechironga scored a try and Makwanya's conversion put Zimbabwe 22-10 ahead on fifty minutes.  Makwanya scored a drop goal with an hour gone before Robert Seguya scored a late pushover try for Uganda. Final score 25-15 to Zimbabwe.

Defending champions Kenya played a series of friendlies against the Mpumalanga Pumas from South Africa.  Kenya coach Michael Otieno is expected to name his travelling party on Tuesday 21 June to play Zimbabwe in Bulawayo on 25 June.

Match 2

Match 3

Match 4

Match 5

Match 6

References

2011
2011 in African rugby union
2011 rugby union tournaments for national teams
2011 in Kenyan sport
2011 in Ugandan sport
2011 in Zimbabwean sport